Kane or KANE may refer to:

Art, entertainment and media

Fictional entities
Kane (comics), the main character of the eponymous comic book series by Paul Grist
Kane (Command & Conquer), character in the Command & Conquer video game series
Kane (fantasy), fantasy character created by Karl Edward Wagner
Kane, a character in the Doctor Who story, Dragonfire
Kane, one of the title characters in Kane & Lynch: Dead Men
Kane, a character in the science fiction film Alien
Kane, a character in the Outlanders science fiction novel series
Kane family, a fictional family on the ABC daytime soap opera All My Children
Kane family in The Kane Chronicles, book series by Rick Riordan
Charles Foster Kane, lead character in the film Citizen Kane
Daniel "Dan" Kane (Captain Terror), ally of Puck
Garrison Kane, a Marvel Comics character
Reverend Henry Kane, a fictional villain from the Poltergeist film series
Lord Kane of Runefaust, from the video game Shining Force
Killer Kane, a villain character in the Buck Rogers film series
Marcus Kane, the vice chancellor on the TV series The 100
Roland Kane, the main antagonist of the 2008 videogame Turok (video game)
Will Kane, lead character in the film High Noon

Music

Kane (instrument), Japanese bell
Kane (American band), American Southern rock band
Kane (Dutch band), Dutch rock band

Other uses in arts, entertainment and media
KANE (AM), radio station licensed to New Iberia, Louisiana, United States
Kane 103.7 FM, community radio station in Guildford, United Kingdom
Kane (video game), 1986 home computer game published by Mastertronic
Citizen Kane, a 1941 film directed by Orson Welles
Kane & Abel (novel), a 1979 novel by Jeffrey Archer

Gods
Kāne, major Hawaiian god
Kāne Milohai, minor Hawaiian god

People
Kane (given name), shared by several notable people
Kane (surname), shared by several notable people
Kane (wrestler) (born 1967), ring name of American professional wrestler and Knox County, Tennessee mayor Glenn Jacobs
Stevie Ray, American professional wrestler Lash Huffman (born 1958), who has used the ring name Kane
Big Daddy Kane (born 1968), rapper
Daniel "Kane" Garcia, of the American hip hop duo Kane & Abel
Harry Kane (Born 1993), English football player

Places
Kane (ancient city), Turkey

America

Illinois
Kane, Illinois, US
Kane County, Illinois, US

Elsewhere
Kane Township, Benton County, Iowa
Kane, Pennsylvania, US, founded by American Civil War general Thomas L. Kane
Kane County, Utah, US
Kane Mountain, mountain in Fulton County, New York
Anoka County–Blaine Airport, Minnesota, US (ICAO airport code: KANE)
Cape Kane, Greenland

See also
Cain (disambiguation)
Cane (disambiguation)
Kain (disambiguation)
Kaine (disambiguation)